Brandon Killham (born December 30, 1997) is an American actor perhaps best known for his portrayal of the younger Don Draper (known by his real name Dick Whitman at that time) on the television series Mad Men.
Killham has also appeared in such films and television series as My Name Is Earl, Arrested Development, October Road, Two and a Half Men, Things You Don't Tell... and Dexter.

References

External links

American male child actors
American male television actors
American male film actors
Living people
1997 births
Male actors from Phoenix, Arizona
21st-century American male actors